Alexis Sauvage (born 30 October 1991) is a French professional footballer who plays as a goalkeeper for Laval.

Career
Sauvage is a youth product of Charleville and Reims and began his senior career as their backup in 2011. He transferred to Boulogne in 2012, where he was originally assigned to their reserves. After 3 seasons in Boulogne, he transferred to Athlético Marseille. On 26 January 2017, he had a short stint with Red Star and helped them win the 2017–18 Championnat National. The following season he moved to Villefranche, where he played 2 seasons. On 27 May 2020, he transferred to Laval. He helped them win the 2021–22 Championnat National, earning promotion into the Ligue 2.

Personal life
Sauvage was the driver in a car accident that resulted in the death of the footballer Maurício Alves, and seriously injured his brother. Sauvage was given a suspended 6-month prison sentence for manslaughter.

Honours
Red Star
Championnat National: 2017–18

Laval
Championnat National: 2021–22

References

External links
 

1991 births
Living people
People from Charleville-Mézières
French footballers
Stade de Reims players
US Boulogne players
Athlético Marseille players
Red Star F.C. players
FC Villefranche Beaujolais players
Stade Lavallois players
Ligue 2 players
Championnat National players
Championnat National 3 players
Association football goalkeepers
French people convicted of manslaughter